Cherokee Middle School was located at the eastern limits of Cherokee, Alabama on the north side of County Road 20.  It served the children of western Colbert County for grades 5 through 8.  The decline of population in the western portion of the county caused the school to close at the end of the 2006 – 2007 school year and the grades merged into Cherokee High School and Cherokee Elementary.

History

Cherokee Middle School was originally Cherokee High School and designated the segregated school for African American children.  It was an original Rosenwald School.  At that time the segregated school for “white” children was named Cherokee Vocational High School.  After the original junior high school building (located on the Cherokee Vocation High School campus) burned in January 1971 Cherokee Middle School began handling grades 5 through 8.  The original building was removed in the 1980s and now the oldest buildings on the campus were in built in the 1960s.

See also
The Rosenwald Schools Initiative

References

Florence–Muscle Shoals metropolitan area
Schools in Colbert County, Alabama
Historically segregated African-American schools in Alabama
Defunct schools in Alabama
Educational institutions established in 1971
Educational institutions disestablished in 2007